Monk's-Hood is a medieval mystery novel by Ellis Peters, set in December 1138. It is the third novel in The Cadfael Chronicles. It was first published in 1980 (1980 in literature).

It was adapted for television in 1994 by Central for ITV.

Gervase Bonel dies from monkshood oil put in his food. Brother Cadfael made the oil. Who used it as poison? Cadfael assesses the motives of Bonel's family and household staff, including his Welsh natural son and his stepson, and deals with Bonel's widow who was once Cadfael's sweetheart long ago. The sergeant views the case differently from Cadfael.

This novel received the Silver Dagger Award in 1980 from the UK's Crime Writers Association. The author was commended by one reviewer for her ability to draw characters who are distinctly medieval, "not modern men and women masquerading in medieval garb," while dealing with fine points of medieval Welsh law. Another reviewer missed the lively character of the second novel, Hugh Beringar, wishing him to be more involved in this plot, yet saying "Peters does wonders with the medieval scene and with complex character relationships."

Plot summary
In early December 1138, Abbot Heribert of Shrewsbury Abbey is summoned to a Legatine council in London and his authority is suspended. The Abbey's business is also postponed, with one exception: Gervase Bonel, who has ceded his manorial estate at Mallilie to the Abbey in return for a small house where his needs in retirement will be provided, is allowed to move his household before the charter is signed. All expect that Heribert or his successor will complete the agreement after the council.

Prior Robert is left in charge of the Abbey. He receives gifts meant for the Abbot, including a fat partridge which he shares with Bonel, having his cook send a portion with dinner. Bonel is taken ill immediately after eating it. Brother Cadfael the herbalist and Brother Edmund the infirmarer run to his aid but cannot save him. Cadfael recognises Bonel's widow as Richildis Vaughan, to whom he was informally betrothed over 40 years earlier. He realises that the sauce in which the partridge was served was poisoned by a liniment he made. Its active ingredient is monkshood (Wolfsbane), deadly if ingested.

The murder is reported to Shrewsbury Castle. Sheriff Prestcote sends the unsubtle Sergeant Will Warden to investigate. As Prior Robert ate the other half of the partridge without ill effects, suspicion falls on Bonel's household. Richildis was never alone with the partridge. Aelfric, who carried the dishes from the kitchen, bears a grudge as Bonel deprived him of free status and made him a villein. Neither the maid, Aldith, nor Meurig, an illegitimate son of Bonel who is apprenticed to Richildis' son-in-law master carpenter Martin Bellecote, have any apparent motive. Edwin Gurney, Richildis' son from her first marriage, was present at part of the meal, but stormed out after a quarrel before Bonel ate the partridge. He and Meurig had come separately from the Abbey's infirmary, where Meurig used the monkshood oil to massage his great uncle, the aged Brother Rhys. Edwin's motive for murdering Bonel is plain to the sergeant. Because the charter with the Abbey is not completed, Edwin will inherit Mallilie.

Warden fails to find Edwin. Late that night Edwin and his same-age nephew, Edwy Bellecote, meet Cadfael in his workshop. By pretending that Bonel was attacked with a sword or dagger, Cadfael establishes that Edwin does not know how Bonel died and is innocent of poisoning him. He disguises Edwin in a monk's habit and conceals him in one of the Abbey's barns. Cadfael suggests that Warden search for the vial which the murderer used to carry the oil. Warden reports that Edwin was seen to throw something glittery into the River Severn. Cadfael questions Edwin, who says that he threw a carved wooden reliquary, a gift intended for Bonel, into the river after their quarrel.

That night, Cadfael visits Richildis to ask if there are other legitimate heirs. If Edwin does not inherit, Mallilie would revert to Bonel's overlord. Richildis reminisces about her former relations with Cadfael. Brother Jerome, Prior Robert's sanctimonious clerk, is eavesdropping outside the door. At Chapter, Jerome betrays Cadfael's and Richildis' former relationship. Prior Robert forbids Cadfael, who is bound by his vow of obedience, to leave the Abbey's precincts.

The same morning, Edwin is discovered in the barn by Abbey servants, and flees on Bonel's fine horse. The boy on the horse is captured after a chase lasting all day. Summoned to give spiritual comfort to the boy, Cadfael finds Edwy Bellecote, who distracted the authorities while Edwin escaped. Deputy Sheriff Hugh Beringar allows Edwy to return to his family on parole. Cadfael sends his assistant, Brother Mark, to search around Bonel's house for any bottle which might have held the poison. Mark finds it in a place where Edwin Gurney could not have thrown it, further proving his innocence to Cadfael.

The Abbey's steward at Mallilie sends word that a brother at a remote sheepfold at Rhydycroesau in Wales has fallen ill. Cadfael realises that Mallilie's location near or within Wales alters motives. Before departing to tend the sick brother, he questions the aged Brother Rhys, uncle to Meurig's mother, about local customs around Mallilie. Beringar is absent, searching for the reliquary which Edwin threw into the river, and Cadfael does not confide his discoveries to the sceptical Sergeant Warden.

At Rhydycroesau, the ailing brother soon recovers. Cadfael visits the manor at Mallilie and then kinfolk of Brother Rhys. At the house of Rhys's brother-in-law, Ifor ap Morgan, he discovers Edwin in hiding. Sergeant Warden follows Cadfael from Mallilie, and takes Edwin into custody. Cadfael now has one chance to get justice for Gervase Bonel, at the Commote court at Llansilin the next day.

At the court, Meurig makes his claim for Mallilie, producing written proof of his paternity. The manor lies within Wales; under Welsh law, a recognised son, born in or out of wedlock, has an over-riding claim to his father's property. Cadfael intervenes, stating that Meurig cannot inherit as he murdered Bonel. He produces the vial and challenges Meurig to display his scrip (linen pouch) to show where the strongly scented oil leaked into it. Meurig flees. Cadfael asks the court to send word of Meurig's guilt to Shrewsbury and returns to Rhydycroesau.

As Cadfael expects, Meurig is waiting for him armed with a knife. Meurig does not take his revenge on Cadfael, but instead confesses to Bonel's murder. He knew from an early age that he would inherit Mallilie under Welsh law, but Bonel's agreement to hand it to Shrewsbury Abbey would put it out of reach. Wanting to gain the manor before the charter was signed, he took some of Cadfael's rubbing oil from the infirmary. Having overheard Aldith say that the partridge was a gift for Bonel, he added the oil to the sauce while briefly alone in the kitchen of Bonel's house. After Warden left the house to search for Edwin, he threw the vial out of the window of the house. Not wanting to take a life for a life, Cadfael tells him his penance is to live a long life, doing as much good as he can. He directs Meurig to escape on the horse at the sheepfold.

Three days after Christmas, Cadfael returns to Shrewsbury to find the monks eagerly awaiting Abbot Heribert's return. When Heribert arrives, he says he has returned as a humble brother to end his days there. He then dashes Prior Robert's hopes of succeeding him by introducing Radulfus, their new Abbot appointed by the Legatine Council. The new abbot lets Edwin declare Aelfric free, but the steward will run Mallilie until Edwin is of age to inherit it. Cadfael is content that Edwin and his mother will move there, and depart from his life.

Characters
Brother Cadfael: Herbalist monk at Shrewsbury Abbey, a skill he learned over time, along with “medicining”. His past before becoming a Benedictine monk includes his story of the one time he considered marrying. As he once expected, she has children and grandchildren, who he meets in his new life. He is age 58 in this story.
Abbot Heribert: Head of the Abbey of Saint Peter and Saint Paul for eleven years. He is a gentle and peaceful man. When King Stephen reclaimed Shrewsbury Castle and Shropshire for his own in summer, Heribert did not act quickly enough to officially recognise Stephen as King, earning some bad feeling from the King. Heribert is called to a Legatine Council, at which he anticipates rebuke and perhaps a change in his status at the Abbey – to return as Abbot or a simple monk. Introduced in A Morbid Taste for Bones. Real historical person.
Prior Robert Pennant: Priest and monk at the Abbey. He is ambitious, patrician, and devoted to the rules. He often “looks down his long patrician nose” at others. He is 51 years old, with little change in his appearance in ten years – tall, silvery haired. He expects to be named replacement for Heribert, but never says so, though he moves into the Abbot's lodging rather quickly. He wrote a book on Saint Winifred, the saint specially honoured at the Abbey, with a reliquary and her own altar, as told in A Morbid Taste for Bones. Real historical person.
Brother Jerome: Clerk to Prior Robert. He is one to curry favour with the Prior, doing tasks for him as requested or anticipated. Like all the monks in titled positions, he was first named in A Morbid Taste for Bones.
Brother Richard: Sub-prior. He is an easygoing man, who takes over the Prior's duties while Heribert is away. Introduced in A Morbid Taste for Bones.
Brother Petrus: Cook for the Abbot's house. He prepared the fat partridge in spiced wine sauce, and was the first suspect to be cleared.  Petrus was attached to Heribert, and spared no dislike for Prior Robert.
Brother Edmund: Infirmarer, in charge of the Abbey's hospital.
Brother Mark: A novice recently assigned to Cadfael as his assistant in the herbarium. He is about 18 years old. He was mentioned by description, not by name, at the end of A Morbid Taste for Bones. Now he is becoming more at ease with life, his vocation in the monastery and with Cadfael. He lived with an uncle who did not like him, and sent him to the monastery at age 16. Young as he is, his talents and insights lead Cadfael to think that Mark will be a monk and also train to be a priest.
Alberic of Ostia: Benedictine monk and Cardinal-bishop of Ostia, legate come from Rome to show papal approval of King Stephen as sovereign of England, and convene a legatine council in London to reorganise the local church, including election of a new archbishop for Canterbury. He is a real historical person and the council did occur.
Gervase Bonel: Second husband of the widowed Richildis, stepfather to her son. He is the lord of Mallilie manor in the north of the county with tenants, and long widowed with no legitimate children when he married for the second time. He wants to give over his manor to the Abbey in return for a messuage at the Abbey plus meals, linen, clothing, and stabling for a horse provided. Moves house before the final charter is signed, a week after Heribert left for London. He is a man of angry and provocative temper, who dies from poison in his food.
Richildis, Mistress Bonel: Wife of Gervase Bonel these three years and mother of married daughter Sibil and much younger son Edwin. In her teens (42 years earlier) as Richildis Vaughan, she was secretly engaged to Cadfael, who took up the cross for the Crusade, so she married Eward Gurney, a carpenter and father to her two children. She was widowed five years earlier. When she remarried, her second husband, lacking a legitimate heir, promised to leave his manor to his stepson. She is the same age as Cadfael, 58 years old, who recognises her on first sight. She agrees with Cadfael that in her second marriage she had married "out of her kind", from tradespeople to lord of a manor.
Aelfric: Man servant to the Bonel household. He came to the herbarium to get herbs for cooking when the monk's hood ointment was handed out, and normally fetches the family meal from the Abbot's kitchen. He was born free, forced by lawsuit to villein status by Bonel. He is about 25 years old.
Aldith: Serving girl to the Bonel household. She is distant kin to Richildis, who took her in two years earlier when the girl was orphaned. She prepares meals, keeps the Abbey-provided meals warm enough. She is a pretty young woman. She likes Aelfric.
Edwin Gurney: The brown-eyed son of Richildis and her first husband. He is at odds with his stepfather. He is training with his brother-in-law, carpenter Martin Bellecote, and friends with Meurig. He is 17 years younger than his sister, and 14 years old as this story unfolds. He is presumed guilty by the sergeant sent to start the investigation.
Brother Rhys: Older monk of Welsh birth and still speaks the language, with kin connected to the Bonel household, and originally from the area near Mallilie. His grand nephew Meurig gives him a massage with the ointment of ground root of monk's hood in oil, a true kindness. In Wales, his family history is Rhys ap Griffith (Rhys, son of Griffith), and he is near 80 years old. Introduced in A Morbid Taste for Bones.
Meurig: Young man 24 or 25 years old, born to a Welsh mother and English father. He is journeyman to a master carpenter in town (Martin Bellecote). Prior to the story he worked at Mallilie manor. His late mother was niece to Brother Rhys, and worked at Mallilie. He considers his kin to be his Welsh side. His father was Gervase Bonel, thus his “by-blow” or natural son.
Gilbert Prestcote: Sheriff of Shropshire. He dispatched a sergeant to hear the story at Bonel's death. Introduced in One Corpse Too Many.
Sibil Bellecote: Wife of Martin, daughter of Richildis and Eward Gurney. She has four children: son Edwy, 14; daughter Alys, age 11; son Thomas, age 8; daughter Diota, age 4. She is about 32 years old
Martin Bellecote: Master carpenter in Shrewsbury. He trained under Eward Gurney, is married to his daughter Sibil, and father to their four children. He is in his late thirties.
Edwy Bellecote: Son of Martin and Sibil Bellecote, born 4 months before his uncle Edwin Gurney. He is 14 years old, with brown hair and hazel eyes. He and his uncle were raised together as friends, look much alike, and are great partners in play and in work.
Hugh Beringar: Recently appointed Deputy Sheriff of Shropshire by King Stephen. He already has Cadfael's respect. He is a young nobleman with manors in the north of the shire at Maesbury. He enters the case when the Sheriff is away to visit King Stephen for the Christmas feast. Cadfael says of Hugh, that he is “a decent, fair-minded man who’ll not tolerate injustice.” He finds the wood reliquary. He is about 23 years old. Introduced in One Corpse Too Many.
Sergeant William Warden: Officer of the law sent by Sheriff Prestcote when Bonel was found murdered. He is a diligent officer, but rather more interested in closing a case than finding full justice, and a bit pompous.
Lay Brothers Barnabas and Simon: Two men living at an Abbey sheepfold near Rhydycroesau, by Oswestry. Barnabas fell ill; Simon sought help by sending a message via the steward from the Abbey now at Mallilie, a nearby manor.
Cynfrith ap Rhys: A first cousin of Brother Rhys, but much younger, perhaps by 20 years. Brother of Owain ap Rhys. He is pleased to receive the greetings of his cousin from Cadfael.
Ifor ap Morgan: Brother-in-law of Brother Rhys and grandfather to Meurig. Cadfael visits him while nearby at the sheepfold, to relay greetings from Rhys. He finds more than Ifor at his home.
Owain ap Rhys: Brother to Cynfrith, cousin of Brother Rhys. He has dealings in the Welsh court regarding his property boundaries while Cadfael is yet aiding Barnabas and Simon.
Father Radulfus: Introduced to the monks by Heribert as both return from the Legatine Council three days after the Christmas feast, just as Cadfael returns from Rhydycroesau. The Council selected Radulfus as the next Abbot. This is a very brief introduction; he is tall, hair still dark around his tonsure. Based on the real abbot who succeeded Heribert.

Title
There is a bit of word play in the book's title in English, Monk's Hood. First is what seems the most direct meaning, the ground up root of the plant in the liniment that gets used as a poison in food, the plant having the common name from the appearance of its flower. It refers to another plot element as well, the monk's hood that briefly hides the untonsured head of the innocent boy who is the number one suspect for the sergeant.  Last, it is the symbol of the monk's robe with its hood that Cadfael wears all the time.

The author does make a point of using herbs and medicinal plants of that era, accurately. One book discusses the series from the perspective of the herbs. In an interview in 1993, Peters said she used Culpepper and an untitled book from the 15th century for information on the herbs, and typical medicines. Herbs play a supporting role in most of the novels, but “In Monk’s Hood, of course, that was the poison. I haven’t done much with herbs that have mixed properties—either beneficial or poisonous, depending on their use. I’d like to get back to using herbs more in my plots. I haven’t used them so much in the last few books.”

Background and setting in history
Although the characters and events in the novel are invented, Heribert and Radulfus were real abbots of Shrewsbury Abbey, and Radulfus really did replace Heribert in 1138. There really was a legatine conference in Westminster in 1138 led by Alberic of Ostia, a Benedictine monk and cardinal-bishop of Ostia, sent by the Pope to recognise King Stephen and to elect a new archbishop for Canterbury. Prior Robert Pennant is also a real person, who eventually succeeded Radulfus in 1148.

The places named in the story are real, including Shrewsbury Abbey, Shrewsbury Castle, the river Severn that winds around the town and separates the Abbey from the town proper. Oswestry and the nearby village of Rhydycroesau are real. The latter strides the modern border between England and Wales. Llansilin was the town where court was held for the commote of Cynllaith. Croesau Bach (cy) was then in Wales, and is now part of Shropshire (as described in Welsh Wikipedia). Cadfael describes his own home in Wales as "The vale of Conwy is my native place, near by Trefriw." The chase of the sergeant's men to capture the boy on the fine horse went from the ford at Uffington, through Atcham, Cound and Cressage, ending in the woods near Acton, all real places and quite a ride. Meurig left traces of himself as he followed out his penance to live. There was a message from the monastery at Beddgelert where he left the horse to be returned to Rhydycroesau; his written confession sent from Penllyn (now split between Llanystumdwy and Criccieth in Gwynedd) via Bangor on account of the heavy snows around the Christmas feast, sent by coastal ship east to Chester, then by land to the Sheriff of Shrewsbury. Cadfael wonders, will he travel up to one of the ports Clynnog or Caergybi to take ship for Ireland, or stay in Wales. The start of the route follows Cadfael's initial advice for him to cross the mountains west from their encounter in the sheep barn to reach Gwynedd where he is not known. Then he can make his decisions where to proceed, having made his confession and sent the written copy in a way his whereabouts could not be traced, and all guilt is removed from those remaining in Shrewsbury.

The plant monkshood is truly poisonous in all its parts, though its flowers are attractive, with the upper petals in a shape reminiscent of the hood worn by the Benedictine monks.

This is one of the five Cadfael books (in the series of twenty Chronicles) in which Cadfael's Welsh background, with his knowledge of the language, and the customs and laws of Wales, are important to the plot. Lands along the border of England and Wales were sometimes subject to cases in English courts under English law, or courts under Welsh law (the laws of Hywel Dda), as the claimants preferred. In the situation of the son of a Welsh mother, acknowledged by his non-Welsh father in writing, the Welsh court offered the best promise of a resolution in his favour, to inherit the land where he was born. English courts did not recognise him as a son to his father, the lord of that manor, Mallilie.

Although Cadfael has withdrawn from most worldly concerns by entering the Benedictine order, he retains a shrewd appreciation of Welsh customs and character, and his fluency in the Welsh language.

The book highlights the degree to which family and blood relationships were important in the Middle Ages; the dead man Bonel, his wife's family, his natural son, a host of smallholders in Wales, and the aged Brother Rhys in Shrewsbury Abbey are connected by blood or marriage. The motive for murder was love of the land, the land where he was born, for the son of a Welsh mother.

Reviews and awards
Kirkus Reviews finds it superior entertainment but misses a character from the prior novel:

Brother Cadfael, worldly-wise and gentle herbalist at the 12th-century Shrewsbury Abbey, returns for a third adventure—which takes place after King Stephen's victory in the recent civil war. ... So, with the help of faithful apprentice Mark and old chum Hugh Beringer, Cadfael follows a series of hard-won clues to the Welsh border and there, in a daring confrontation, tags the true culprit. As before, Peters does wonders with the medieval scene and with complex character relationships; unfortunately, however, lively Hugh Beringar (a major presence in One Corpse Too Many) makes only a brief appearance here, so this is slightly less sprightly than its predecessors. Still—superior entertainment for historically inclined mystery fans. Pub Date: 14 May 1981 Publisher: Morrow

Mystery author, librarian and medieval historian Dean James finds Ellis to be strong in her ability to draw characters who are distinctly medieval, not modern. Cadfael can be trusted by the reader to "have the wisdom and compassion to do everything within his power to set the disordered situation to rights."

Peters offers her readers a view of medieval England during a particular time in its history, but she also provides a fascinating introduction to medieval culture and intellectual life as well. Many of the books in the series present various medieval ideas which are quite different from modern thinking, but Peters explains them easily. integrating them into the plots of her novels. For example, in The Sanctuary Sparrow (Morrow, 1984), the jongleur Liliwin seeks sanctuary from his pursuers in the abbey church. The Pilgrim of Hate (Morrow, 1985) involves miracles and a pilgrimage; Monks-Hood (Morrow, 1981) explores some thorny points in medieval Welsh law. Two recent novels in the series address more complex issues: The Heretic's Apprentice (Mysterious Press, 1989) deals with heresy and its suppressions by the Church, and The Potter's Field (Mysterious Press, 1990) uses the medieval concept of the wheel of fate.

The characters ... are recognizably different; they are distinctly medieval in what they do and how they think. These are not modern men and women masquerading in medieval garb. Peters [is]... to be celebrated for [her]... achievement... in bringing the Middle Ages vividly to life in ... crime fiction. Lovers of medieval myster[ies] can read Peters... and enjoy them for their differences and revel in the vast panorama of life in Medieval England.

Monk's Hood won an award from the Crime Writers' Association in 1980, the CWA Silver Dagger award.

Publication history
Monk's Hood was first published in the UK by Macmillan in August 1980,  / 9780333294109 (UK edition). The US hardback edition was published in April 1981. Two large print editions were issued in June 1982 and January 1998.

Nine paperback editions were issued in the US and the UK, the first in 1982, and the most recent in April 2010 by Sphere.

Fifteen audio book editions have been issued on cassette and CD. Chivers issued the first in September 1990; the most recent is from ISIS in April 2012.

The novel has been published in French, German, Italian, Dutch, and Portuguese, listed at Goodreads. It was also published in Danish.

French: Le capuchon du moine (Frère Cadfael, #3), Published 2001 by 10/18, Mass Market Paperback, 287 pages  (9782264033369)
German:  Bruder Cadfael und das Mönchskraut, Ein mittelalterlicher Kriminalroman Published 2002 by Heyne, 254 pages, Eva Malsch (Übersetzerin)  (9783453186644)
Italian:  Il cappuccio del monaco, Paperback, Published 1 January 1992 by Tea, 204 pages  (9788878192256)
Dutch:  Het gemene gewas, Paperback, Published 1995 by De Boekerij, 213 pages, Pieter Janssens (Translator)  (9789022508398)
Portuguese: Justiça à Moda Antiga [Old Fashioned Justice], Paperback, Published 1984 by Europa-América
Danish: Stedsønnen fra Mallilie [Stepson from Mallilie], by Ellis Peters, (Translator or narrator) Søren Elung Jensen 2000 Copenhagen Danmarks Blindebibliotek (audiobook, OCLC 473817503)

Adaptations

Radio
Monk's Hood was the third Cadfael book to be adapted for BBC Radio, in sequence with the publication of the novels. The radio adaptation was written by Bert Coules, and starred Philip Madoc as Brother Cadfael and Geoffrey Whitehead as Prior Robert. It was first broadcast on BBC Radio 4 in 1991, in five parts:
 Troubled Times
 The Inheritance
 Hunted
 Mallilie
 Judgement

It has since been re-broadcast on BBC Radio 7, then BBC Radio 4 Extra, and released as an audio book (and reviewed).

Television

The book was the fourth to be adapted for television by Central and Carlton Media for distribution worldwide, in 1994. It was out of sequence as two later books in the series preceded it on the screen. The "Cadfael" television series eventually extended to thirteen episodes, all of which starred Sir Derek Jacobi as the sleuthing monk. The series was filmed mostly in Hungary.

The television adaptation for Monk's Hood stuck fairly closely to the original novel. Although several Welsh actors appeared, Jacobi retained an educated English accent.

References

External links
 
 The Crime Writers Association
 Mystery Scene Magazine's official website

1980 British novels
British mystery novels
Novels by Edith Pargeter
Novels set in Shropshire
Fiction set in the 1130s
Novels set in the 12th century
Macmillan Publishers books